Ahmed bin Mūsa, known as Ba Ahmed, was  (Grand Wazir) of Morocco and de facto ruler of the kingdom between the 1894 and 1900. He became the country's true regent, after enthroning the son of Hassan I, Abd al-Aziz, as sultan, who was a child at the time, despite there being older siblings. Ba Ahmed's rule, as the rule of Mawlay Hassan before him, of whom his was grand vizier, continued to entangle Morocco in financial and political crisis, with catastrophic reforms to the tax and duty systems, and deepened the dependency of the throne —who could hardly collect any taxes— on foreign powers to quell rebellions, pay soldiers and servants and ultimately stay in power. He died in 1900.

Ba Ahmed's descendants, as members of the French colonial elite with strong links to the palace, continue to this day to play a key role in the political and economic life of Morocco. One of his grandsons, Chakib Benmoussa, has held several high profile posts under the current king of Morocco, Mohammed VI, who appointed him first as CEO of one his companies (SONASID) then as Minister of the Interior then head of the Conseil Economique et Social and then ambassador to France.

Described as a "short and fat man", he was responsible for expanding the Bahia Palace begun by his father.

References

1840 births
1900 deaths
History of Marrakesh
19th-century Moroccan people
Grand viziers
People from Marrakesh
Moroccan politicians